Grevillea monslacana, commonly known as Lake Mountain grevillea, is a species of flowering plant in the family Proteaceae and is endemic to mountainous areas of eastern Victoria in Australia. It is a spreading to erect shrub with narrowly egg-shaped leaves and clusters of pink to reddish pink flowers.

Description
The upper surface of the leaves is usually glabrous, the lower surface silky-hairy, and the edges curved downwards.

Taxonomy
Grevillea monslacana was first formally described in 2000 by Val Stajsic and Bill Molyneux in the Flora of Australia from specimens collected in the Rubicon State Forest in 1995.

Distribution and habitat
It is listed as "Rare in Victoria" on the Victorian Department of Sustainability and Environment's Advisory List of Rare Or Threatened Plants In Victoria.

References

monslacana
Flora of Victoria (Australia)
Proteales of Australia
Plants described in 2000